This is a list of flag bearers who have represented Mexico at the Olympics.Flag bearers carry the national flag of their country at the opening ceremony of the Olympic Games.

See also 
Mexico at the Olympics

References

Mexico at the Olympics
Mexico
Oly